During the 1994–95 Dutch football season, AFC Ajax competed in the Eredivisie. Ajax won a league-cup double. They won their 25th Dutch title in style, not losing a single match all season and scoring 106 goals. Ajax also won their fourth European Cup, defeating A.C. Milan 1–0 in the final. Ajax also won the Intercontinental Cup, defeating Gremio. This Ajax squad is considered to be one of the best teams in football history.

Overview

Players

First-team squad

Transfers

In

Out
 Stefan Pettersson – IFK Göteborg
 Stanley Menzo – PSV
 Dan Petersen – Odense BK

Results
Between 1994 and 1996, Ajax completed an unbeaten run of 52 domestic matches + 19 UEFA Champions League matches, while the 1995 year is considered as the peak of that. The 1995 Ajax team remained unbeaten for a full year, in Europe and in domestic league, a run of 48 matches overall. The feat of winning simultaneously both the Champions League and domestic league without a single defeat is a historical achievement unmatched by any other team.

Competitions

Eredivisie

League table

Matches

KNVB Cup

Dutch Supercup

UEFA Champions League

Group stage

Knockout phase

Quarter-finals

Semi-finals

Final

See also
List of unbeaten football club seasons

References

Notes

AFC Ajax seasons
AFC Ajax
UEFA Champions League-winning seasons
Dutch football championship-winning seasons